The Red Moulana is a book written about Moulana Abdul Hamid Khan Bhashani by Nurul Kabir. It discusses the life and work of Bhashani, an opponent of the British Raj in India. He was nicknamed the "Red Moulana" for his revolutionary left views and positions. The book is ranked in the National Library of Australia.

Content 
The book includes ten chapters. They describe Bhashani's political work against the exploitation of peasants, against British colonialism, and against ethnic segregation. They cover his role while leaving the Muslim League and in the formation of the Awami League; his fight against the colonial hegemony of the foreign language, the infighting in the Awami League while a faction decided to support Ayub Khan's decision to join a military treaty with the United States; his role in the formation of the National Awami Party; his role against Pakistani neo-colonialism, and how Bhashani joined the Bangladesh Liberation War. The book also discusses his role against the autocratic rule of Bangabandhu Sheikh Mujibur Rahman and Bhashani's subsequent dynamic role during the historic Farakka Long March.

Publication 
The foreword of the book is written by Professor Serajul Islam Choudhury, an eminent littérateur and professor emeritus of University of Dhaka. The book was first published at the Ekushey Book Fair, in 2012, by Samhati Publications Dhaka.

References

Biographies (books)
English-language books
Works by Bangladeshi writers